The 2022–23 Newport County A.F.C. season is the club's tenth consecutive season in the EFL League Two. It is Newport's 70th season in the Football League and 102nd season of league football overall. In addition to the league, they also competed in the FA Cup, EFL Cup and EFL Trophy.

Newport reached the third round of the 2022-23 FA Cup, losing 3-0 to Leicester City of the Premier League.

Former club chairman David Hando died on 16 January 2023. Hando was influential in reforming the club in 1989 after the club had gone bankrupt.

Managerial changes 
On 10 October 2022 James Rowberry was sacked as team manager with Newport in 18th place in League Two after 13 league matches. Assistant manager Carl Serrant was also sacked. Sporting Director Darren Kelly took the role of caretaker manager. On 20 October 2022, Graham Coughlan was appointed manager on a two-and-a-half year contract with Newport in 19th place in League Two after 14 league matches of the 2022-23 season. Joe Dunne was appointed assistant manager to Coughlan Darren Kelly resigned his role as Sporting Director on 23 February 2023.

First-team squad

Squad statistics
Source:

Numbers in parentheses denote appearances as substitute.
Players with squad numbers struck through and marked  left the club during the playing season.
Players with names in italics and marked * were on loan from another club for the whole of their season with Newport County.
Players listed with no appearances have been in the matchday squad but only as unused substitutes.
Key to positions: GK – Goalkeeper; DF – Defender; MF – Midfielder; FW – Forward

|-
!colspan=14|Players out on loan:

|-
!colspan=14|Players who left the club:

|}

Goals record

Disciplinary record

Transfers 
 For those players released or contract ended before the start of this season, see 2021–22 Newport County A.F.C. season.

In

Out

Loans in

Loans out

Pre-season and friendlies 
On May 24, Newport announced the squad would enjoy a 5-day training camp in Cheshire. Three days later, the club announced four off the six pre-season oppositions. A double-header 60-minute games against Cardiff City was later added. A further addition to the pre-season schedule was added on June 14, against Forest Green Rovers.

Competitions

Overall record

League Two

League table

Results summary

Results by round

Matches 

The league fixtures were announced on 23 June 2022.

FA Cup 

County were drawn at home to Colchester United in the first round and to the winners between Torquay United or Derby County in the second round.

EFL Cup 

Newport were drawn away to Luton Town in the first round and at home to Portsmouth in the second round.

EFL Trophy 

On 20 June, the initial Group stage draw was made, grouping Newport County with Exeter City and Forest Green Rovers. Three days later, Southampton U21s joined Southern Group F. In the second round, Newport were drawn away to Milton Keynes Dons.

References 

Newport County
Newport County A.F.C. seasons
Welsh football clubs 2022–23 season